Vaquero is the eleventh studio album by American country music artist Aaron Watson. The album includes the singles "Outta Style", which reached the top 10 on the Billboard Country Airplay chart and "Run Wild Horses".

Critical reception
Rating it 4 out of 5 stars, AllMusic critic Stephen Thomas Erlewine stated that "Vaquero navigates the territory between tradition and modernity, sounding strong and open, never making concessions to pop but never adhering to a calcified notion of country, either."

Commercial performance
Vaquero debuted at No. 2 on Billboards Top Country Albums, selling 37,000 copies (39,000 in album-equivalent units) in the first week, which is Watson's biggest sales week to date. The album has sold 68,800 copies in the United States as of March 2018.

Track listing
All songs written by Aaron Watson, except as noted.
 "Texas Lullaby" – 5:08
 "Take You Home Tonight" – 3:04
 "These Old Boots Have Roots" – 3:30
 "Be My Girl" – 4:10
 "They Don't Make 'Em Like They Used To" – 3:40
 "Vaquero" – 3:46
 "Outta Style" – 3:42
 "Run Wild Horses" – 5:31
 "Mariano's Dream" – 1:41
 "Clear Isabel" – 4:24
 "Big Love in a Small Town" (Watson, Leslie Satcher) – 4:19
 "One Two Step at a Time" (Watson, Kendell Marvel) – 3:32
 "Amen Amigo" (Watson, Tim James, Mac McAnally) – 3:52
 "The Arrow" – 3:45
 "Rolling Stone" (Watson, Altman, Heather Morgan) – 5:06	
 "Diamonds and Daughters" – 3:42

Personnel
Adapted from AllMusic

Marshall Altman - banjo, percussion, background vocals
Glen Duncan - bouzouki, fiddle, mandolin
Stuart Duncan - fiddle
Tony Harrell - accordion, Hammond B-3 organ, Wurlitzer
Jordan Lawson - fiddle
Tony Lucido - bass guitar
Pat McGrath - bouzouki, acoustic guitar
Rob McNelley - electric guitar
Heather Morgan - background vocals
Russ Pahl - autoharp, steel guitar
Jerry Roe - drums, percussion
Aaron Watson - lead vocals

Charts

Weekly charts

Year-end charts

Singles

References

Aaron Watson albums
2017 albums
Albums produced by Marshall Altman